Edgar Dunlap "Sandy" Beaver (October 5, 1883 – December 7, 1969) was a college football and baseball player, high school football coach, and educator. He was owner and director of Riverside Military Academy near Gainesville, Georgia. In 1932 he served as member of the Board of Regents of the University System of Georgia.

University of Georgia
Beaver was a prominent guard for the Georgia Bulldogs of the University of Georgia.

In  1902 he was selected All-Southern.  Sandy played next to All-Southern center Harold Ketron.

Riverside Military Academy
Beaver served as Director of Riverside Military Academy. He held the position at Riverside for over half a century, from 1913 to 1969.  At Riverside he was now known as 'Colonel' instead of Professor. Governor Eugene Talmadge appointed Beaver a brigadier general in the Georgia State Militia. He was thus often known as "General Sandy Beaver". He is a member of the school's sports Hall of Fame.

During his coaching career Beaver coached Riverside, University School For Boys (Stone Mountain), and Donald Fraser. At the University School his quarterback was Kid Woodruff.

References

External links
 

1883 births
1969 deaths
20th-century American educators
American football guards
Georgia Bulldogs baseball players
Georgia Bulldogs football players
High school football coaches in Georgia (U.S. state)
All-Southern college football players
Players of American football from Augusta, Georgia